Seeket Madputeh (born 9 March 1989), simply known as Ket is a professional footballer from Thailand. He is currently playing for Nongbua Pitchaya  in Thai League 1.

Honours

Club
PT Prachuap FC
 Thai League Cup (1) : 2019

External links

1989 births
Living people
Seeket Madputeh
Seeket Madputeh
Association football defenders
Seeket Madputeh
Seeket Madputeh
Seeket Madputeh
Seeket Madputeh
Seeket Madputeh
Seeket Madputeh
Seeket Madputeh
Seeket Madputeh
Seeket Madputeh